The 2016 ATP Challenger China International – Nanchang was a professional tennis tournament played on hard courts. It was the third edition of the tournament which was part of the 2016 ATP Challenger Tour. It took place in Nanchang, China between 12 and 17 September 2016.

Singles main-draw entrants

Seeds

 1 Rankings are as of August 29, 2016.

Other entrants
The following players received wildcards into the singles main draw:
  Sun Fajing
  He Yecong
  Zhang Zhizhen
  Te Rigele

The following player received entry into the singles main draw with a protected ranking:
  Matija Pecotić

The following players received entry from the qualifying draw:
  Denys Molchanov
  Sergey Betov
  Shuichi Sekiguchi
  Xia Zihao

Champions

Singles

 Hiroki Moriya def.   Chung Hyeon, 4–6, 6–1, 6–4.

Doubles

 Wu Di /  Zhang Zhizhen def.  Nicolás Barrientos /  Ruben Gonzales, 7–6(7–4), 6–3.

External links
Official website

2016 ATP Challenger Tour
ATP Challenger China International – Nanchang